McLawhorn is a surname. Notable people with the surname include:

Charles McLawhorn (1927–2000), American politician
Marian N. McLawhorn, American politician
Troy McLawhorn (born 1968), American musician, songwriter, and record producer